Gastón Luis Martiré (born 7 March 1999) is an Argentine professional footballer who plays as a forward for Fundación Amigos, on loan from Villa Dálmine.

Career
Martiré, via youth stints with Unión and Renato Cesarini, began his senior career with Villa Dálmine; having signed in 2016. He made the breakthrough into first-team football in the 2018–19 Primera B Nacional season, with manager Felipe De la Riva selecting him as a substitute for a Copa Argentina round of sixty-four tie with UAI Urquiza on 17 July 2018. His professional debut arrived in the following round of the competition, as he came off the bench in Villa Dálmine's defeat to River Plate on 28 July. He made his Primera B Nacional bow in April 2019 against Defensores de Belgrano.

In January 2020, Martiré was loaned to Fundación Amigos of Torneo Regional Federal Amateur.

Career statistics
.

References

External links

1999 births
Living people
Footballers from Santa Fe, Argentina
Argentine footballers
Association football forwards
Primera Nacional players
Villa Dálmine footballers